Deva Manoharan Swaminathan (born 30 April 1945) is a Sri Lankan Tamil lawyer, politician and ex cabinet minister.

Early life and family

Swaminathan was born on 30 April 1945. He is the son of M. Swaminathan and Lalithambikai (daughter of S. Pararajasingam and grand daughter of P. Arunachalam). He was educated at Royal College, Colombo. After school he joined Ceylon Law College, qualifying as an advocate of the Supreme Court.

Career
After qualifying Swaminathan started practising law in Colombo, taking over the chambers of proctor Ratnakaram which were renamed D. M. Swaminathan Associates in 1971.

Swaminathan was appointed Governor of Western Province in June 1994 after the controversial dismissal of Suppiah Sharvananda by President D. B. Wijetunga. He was appointed chairman of the National Savings Bank in March 2002, serving until 2004.

Swaminathan was appointed as one of the United National Party's (UNP) National List MPs in the Sri Lankan Parliament following the 2010 parliamentary election. In October 2010 he was appointed to the Parliamentary Council which was established by the controversial 18th Amendment to make non-binding recommendations the president on the membership of various national commissions. After the 2015 presidential election he was appointed Minister of Resettlement, Reconstruction and Hindu Religious Affairs by newly elected President Maithripala Sirisena.

Swaminathan was re-appointed as a National List MP following the 2015 parliamentary election. He was appointed Minister of Rehabilitation and Resettlement on 24 August 2015. He was given the additional portfolio of Hindu Affairs on 4 September 2015. He was given the additional portfolio of Prison Reforms on 11 November 2015.

Swaminathan has been a member of the Rotary Club of Colombo since 1971. He is a trustee of the Sri Ponnambala Vaneswara Temple at Sea Street in Kochchikade, Colombo which was founded by his great-great-grand father A. Ponnambalam. He is one of the UNP's vice-chairmen. He was also treasurer of the UNP.

Notes

References

External links
 D. M. Swaminathan Associates

1945 births
Alumni of Ceylon Law College
Alumni of Royal College, Colombo
Cabinet ministers of Sri Lanka
Ceylonese advocates
Coomaraswamy family
Governors of Western Province, Sri Lanka
Living people
Members of the 14th Parliament of Sri Lanka
Members of the 15th Parliament of Sri Lanka
People from Colombo
Sri Lankan Hindus
Sri Lankan Tamil lawyers
Sri Lankan Tamil politicians
United National Party politicians